Christianity is the second largest religion in Punjab Province of Pakistan comprising 2.3% of its population. Most Christians (81%) of Pakistan live in Punjab province. There are 2,068,233 Christians in Punjab province as of 2017, up from 1,699,843 in 1998.

The churches in Lahore include Cathedral Church of Resurrection, Sacred Heart Cathedral, Lahore, St. Andrew's Church, Lahore, St. Anthony's Church, Lahore and St. Joseph’s Church, Lahore. Lahore and Faisalabad have more Christian population than any other city in Punjab. Most Punjabi Christians are converts from the Hindu Churas and Mazhabi Sikh caste to Christianity during the British Raj in colonial India.

History 
The Christians of colonial India were active in the Indian National Congress and wider Indian independence movement, being collectively represented in the All India Conference of Indian Christians, which advocated for swaraj and opposed the partition of India. 

The meeting of the All India Conference of Indian Christians in Lahore in December 1922, which had a large attendance of Punjabis, resolved that the clergymen of the Church in India should be drawn from the ranks of Indians, rather than foreigners. The AICIC also stated that Indian Christians would not tolerate any discrimination based on race or skin colour.

S. K. Datta of Lahore, who served as the principal of Forman Christian College, became the president of the All India Conference of Indian Christians, representing the Indian Christian community at the Second Round Table Conference, where he agreed with Mahatma Gandhi's views on minorities and Depressed Classes.

On 30 October 1945, the All India Conference of Indian Christians formed a joint committee with the Catholic Union of India that passed a resolution in which, "in the future constitution of India, the profession, practice and propagation of religion should be guaranteed and that a change of religion should not involve any civil or political disability." This joint committee enabled the Christians in colonial India to stand united, and in front of the British Parliamentary Delegation "the committee members unanimously supported the move for independence and expressed complete confidence in the future of the community in India." The office for this joint committee was opened in Delhi, in which the Vice-Chancellor of Andhra University M. Rahnasamy served as President and B.L. Rallia Ram of Lahore served as General Secretary. Six members of the joint committee were elected to the Minorities Committee of the Constituent Assembly. 

Following the partition of colonial India, the Catholic Union of India granted independence to its branches in Sind and Baluchistan in its Second Annual General Meeting in Bangalore in October 1947, which was presided by Ruthnasamy.

Punjab is considered a province with persecution of Christians. Asia Bibi has been convicted of blasphemy, with the government of Punjab being in favour of her execution.

Notable People
Sunita Marshall, actress
Sidra Sadaf, cyclist
Captain Cecil Chaudhry, academic, activist, and fighter pilot for the Pakistan Air Force
Nazir Latif, former Air Commodore of Pakistan Air Force
Shahbaz Bhatti, former member of Pakistan National Assembly, and Pakistan Peoples Party
Bishop Anthony Theodore Lobo, former minister of the Pakistan Roman Catholic Church
Bishop Lawrence Saldanha, Archbishop 
Major General Julian Peter, former Major-General of Pakistan Army
Reverend Samuel Azariah, bishop of the Church of Pakistan
Nirmal Roy, singer
Shazia Hidayat, athlete
Bohemia (rapper), Pakistani-American rapper born Roger David

Christian denominations in the province 
Anglican Catholic Church
Associate Reformed Presbyterian Church in Pakistan
Church of Pakistan
Presbyterian Church of Pakistan
United Presbyterian Church of Pakistan
New Apostolic Church in Pakistan
Roman Catholic Church

See also
Punjabi Christians
Christianity in Pakistan
Christian Medical College Ludhiana
St. Thomas' High School, Jhelum
Presentation Convent School, Jhelum
Forman Christian College

References